James W. and Anne Smith Phyfe Estate is a national historic district located at Nissequogue in Suffolk County, New York.  The district encompasses an estate with two contributing buildings.  The estate house is a large two-story Neoclassical style structure built in 1904. It features a colossal attic pediment carried on two-story Ionic order columns enclosing a cantilevered balcony on the second floor. Located nearby is a contributing carriage house.

It was added to the National Register of Historic Places in 1993.

References

Houses on the National Register of Historic Places in New York (state)
Historic districts on the National Register of Historic Places in New York (state)
Houses completed in 1904
Carriage houses in the United States
Houses in Suffolk County, New York
National Register of Historic Places in Suffolk County, New York